Aïyb Dieng is a Senegalese drummer and percussionist specializing in hand drums.  He has recorded two solo album, including Rhythmagick (1995), and has worked with a wide range of musicians, including as a regular collaborator of bassist/producer Bill Laswell.

Biography
He was born and raised in Senegal, West Africa. By the age of 14 he was playing professionally in a band that consisted of nine relatives.

Dieng received his first album credit on Brian Eno and Jon Hassell's 1980 Fourth World, Vol. 1: Possible Musics, playing percussion on conga drums and a clay drum called ghatam.  Soon after, he worked with jazz pianist Masabumi Kikuchi on Susto. Dieng also played on Mick Jagger's solo project, She's the Boss. Other noteworthy credits include work with Yoko Ono (singer/composer/artist), Bill Laswell (producer/bassist/guitarist), William S. Burroughs (beatnik author), Haruomi Hosono, Bob Marley (reggae singer), and Ginger Baker.  In 1981 he performed at the Woodstock Jazz Festival, held in celebration of the tenth anniversary of the Creative Music Studio.

In his early years in the U.S., Dieng taught African drumming at the Creative Music Studio in Woodstock, New York.  He went on to perform with Karl Berger at Carnegie Hall and Avery Fisher Hall. The chatan was introduced by Dieng. It was played on Herbie Hancock's 1984 album Sound-System. His debut solo album, Rhythmagick, was released in 1995 by Bill Laswell's record label Subharmonic.

Dieng was a featured musician on Ejigayehu "Gigi" Shibawbaw's 2010 album, Mesgana Ethiopia.

Discography
Rythmes Africains (1978, Auvidis)
Rhythmagick (1995, Subharmonic)

Notes

Senegalese drummers
Year of birth missing (living people)
Living people
Deadline (band) members
SXL (band) members